Semarang–Demak Toll Road is an under-construction toll road that will connect Semarang with Demak in Java, Indonesia. The  toll road will act as a complement to the Trans-Java Toll Road. The toll road will increase accessibility and road network in the northern parts of Java. The toll road will be integrated with a sea dike at the northern beach of Semarang City, all the way until the Sayung River at Demak Regency.

The goal of constructing this toll road is to minimize congestion along the Semarang–Demak-Surabaya northern coast road of Java and also to the tourist cities in Demak, namely; Kadilangu/Sunan Kalijaga Tomb and Demak Great Mosque, as well as to overcome tidal flooding along the northern coast as a retaining sea wall guarder. The toll road is expected to be completed by 2021.

Sections
The toll road is divided into two sections, namely Section I of Semarang City and Section II of Demak Regency.

 Section I Semarang City: District Genuk: Ex. Terboyo Wetan, Terboyo Kulon & Tirtomulyo
 Section II Regency of Demak: District Sayung: Sriwulan Village, Bedono, Purwosari, Sidogemah, Sayung. Loireng & Tambakroto. District Karangtengah: Batu Village, Wonokerto, Kedunguter, Dukun, Karangsari, Pulosari & Grogol. District Wonosalam: Karangrejo Village, Wonosalam & Kendal Doyong. District Demak City: Ex. Kadilangu.

Toll gates

See also

References

External links

Toll roads in Indonesia
Transport in Central Java